Felicità Sartori, later von Hoffmann (c. 1714–1760) was an Italian painter and pastellist.

Life 
Sartori was born in Pordenone, the daughter of a notary. Her uncle was Antonio dall'Agata, an engraver in Gorizia, and it was he who served as her first teacher. It was also he who arranged for her to join the studio of Rosalba Carriera, and she moved to Venice around 1728. Carriera was at the height of her popularity, and it is believed that Sartori, along with her sisters, provided copies of her work for sale. Sartori remained close to her teacher, but around 1741 she was invited to Dresden by Franz Joseph von Hoffmann, councilor to August III. The following year she married him. He died in 1749, at which point her movements become unclear; some have suggested that she remarried and moved to Bamberg, while others have claimed that she was still in Dreden in 1753 and died there in 1760. The surviving works known to be hers are apparently all miniatures, mostly drawn from well-known works by Carriera; it is also recorded that she produced some copies in oil. An early biographer notes that she learned pastel before specializing in miniatures, and the extent of her work in the medium is unclear, although it seems likely that some of those copies in pastel of Carriera's work which survive might be hers. Around 19 miniatures survive in Dresden; all date to her time in that city. A portrait of Sartori by her teacher is held by the Uffizi Gallery.

References

1710s births
1760 deaths
Italian women painters
18th-century Italian painters
18th-century Italian women artists
People from Pordenone
Painters from Venice
Pastel artists